Seven Sisters Provincial Park and Protected Area is a provincial park in British Columbia, Canada, protecting part of the Howson Range between Hazelton and Terrace and comprising approximately 27,200 hectares.

See also
 Seven Sisters Peaks
 Orion Peak

References

Skeena Country
Hazelton Mountains
Provincial parks of British Columbia
Protected areas established in 2000
2000 establishments in British Columbia